Chupamarca District is one of thirteen districts of the Castrovirreyna Province in Peru.

Geography 
Other mountains are listed below:

References